The 2015 Copa de la Reina de Balonmano was the 36th edition of the Copa de la Reina de Balonmano. It took place in Castellón de la Plana, city of the Valencian Community, from 20 to 22 February. The matches were played at Pabellón Ciutat de Castelló, with 6,000 capacity seating. It was hosted by Federación Valenciana de Balonmano, Comunidad de Madrid, Castellón municipality & RFEBM. Castellón hosted Copa de la Reina for the last time in 1982.

Rocasa G.C. ACE won its first-ever title after defeating BM Bera Bera in the Final 20–19.

Venue

First round 

|}

Final Eight

Matches

Quarter-finals

Semifinals

Final

Top goalscorers 

Source: own compilation

See also 
 2014–15 División de Honor Femenina de Balonmano

References

External links 
 Official website

2015
Copa